Bayesian learning mechanisms are probabilistic causal models used in computer science to research the fundamental underpinnings of machine learning, and in cognitive neuroscience, to model conceptual development.

Bayesian learning mechanisms have also been used in economics and cognitive psychology to study social learning in theoretical models of herd behavior.

See also
 Active learning
 Bayesian learning
 Cognitive acceleration
 Cognitivism (learning theory)
 Constructivist epistemology
 Developmental psychology
 Fluid and crystallized intelligence
 Inquiry-based learning
 Kohlberg's stages of moral development
 Theory theory

References